The Midland Railway 1134A Class was a class of 0-4-0ST steam locomotives.  They were a development of the preceding 1116A Class, but were generally larger in most dimensions.  The subsequent 1528 Class was effectively a side tank version of this class.

Five were built in 1897 and five in 1903, all at Derby Works.  Their original numbers were 1134A–1143A, i.e. all of them on the duplicate list.  Their 1907 numbers were 1518–1527. Seven passed to the London, Midland and Scottish Railway in 1923, and two were inherited by British Railways in 1948, numbers 1518 and 1523.  These became BR 41518 and 41523.  41523 was withdrawn in 1955.  41518 was the last withdrawn in 1958, it having been a shunter at Staveley Ironworks.  None was preserved.

References

 An Illustrated Review of Midland Locomotives Volume 3 - Tank Engines by R. J. Essery & D. Jenkinson 

1134A Class
0-4-0ST locomotives
Railway locomotives introduced in 1897